Baptism of Christ is a painting by Italian Renaissance painter Cima da Conegliano, dating from 1492. It is housed in the church of San Giovanni in Bragora in Venice.

Description

The painting portrays Christ at the center of the scene, standing with joined hands. His attitude is that of humble submission to baptism, which is being given him by Saint John the Baptist, who appears on the right.

At the left are three angels with Christ's garments, in red and blue colors, which he will use after the baptism. The scene is completed by an angelic choir in the sky, and a generic oriental city on a spur in the left, behind the angels, while another one is visible in the far background.

External links
Page at the church's website 

1492 paintings
Paintings by Cima da Conegliano
Cima da Conegliano
Angels in art
Paintings in Venice